Michael Kugel (born December 5, 1946) is a Ukrainian viola player and composer.

Biography
Born in Kharkiv, USSR, he studied at the Beethoven School of Music, at the Music College in Kharkiv and later at the Leningrad (Saint Petersburg) Conservatory.

In 1975 he won First Prize (joint with Zoltan Toth) at the International Viola Competition in Budapest.

During years 1975-1990 Michael Kugel was the soloist of the Moscow Philharmonic Organisation, violist of the Beethoven Quartet and professor at the Moscow Conservatory. From 1990 till 1996 Michael Kugel was a professor at the Jerusalem Rubin Academy of Music and Dance.

In 1996 he settled in Belgium and now he is a professor at the Ghent Conservatory (Belgium) and at the Conservatorium Maastricht in the Netherlands.

Michael Kugel appeared as a soloist with many major symphony orchestras in the world and also appeared as a conductor with many orchestras.

He has taken part in Festivals in Schleswig-Holstein, Lockenhause, Lille, Rolandseck, Passau, Jerusalem, Rizor, Orebro, Krems, Divonn, Menton, Mürzzuschlag, Venezia, Festival van Vlaanderen, Dubrovnik, Cincinnati, etc.

Michael Kugel was a member of jury for International competitions in England, Austria, Israel, USA, Croatia, Belgium, Germany and CIS:
V Lionel Tertis International Viola Competition, Workshop and World Viola Congress, 1994
First International Viola Competition in Vienna, 1998
Primrose Memorial Viola Competition, 1999
IX Lionel Tertis International Viola competition and Workshop, 2006
etc.

Michael Kugel has given masterclass in Germany, England, Italy, Sweden, Austria, Finland, Mexico, Israel, France, Belgium, Croatia, CIS, Holland, Canada etc.

Michael Kugel has enriched the viola repertoire with many transcriptions and with his own compositions : Sonata-Poem for viola solo, Concerto for viola and orchestra, Suite in memoriam Shostakovich for viola and piano, sonatas etc. His compositions also include a piano sonata, chamber symphony and chamber music among others.

He has recorded about 20 discs and also made numerous records as a viola d'amore player as well.

He is the author of three books : 
The history of an era. An interpretation of two works for viola Viola
Masterpieces of the Instrumental Music
Musical Essay

Michael Kugel is the founder and the President of the Belgian Viola Society.

Selected compositions
Michael Kugel's compositions are published by Alain Van Kerckhoven Editeur.
 Il Carnevale di Venezia for Viola and Piano (2001)
 Classical Preludes for Viola and Piano (1999)
 Sonata-Poem for Viola Solo (1987)
 Suite in Memoriam Shostakovich for Viola and Piano (1988)

Michael Kugel's works are published by Nototeka (publisher Dmitry Yuferov)
Musical Essay (2014)
Ostinato. sonata for pianoforte (2015)
Nostalgia. Divertiento for viola and piano (2015)

Discography
He has recorded about 20 discs and also made numerous records as a viola d'amore player as well. He made them in the former Soviet Union but unfortunately most of those records are unavailable.

His recent recordings include:
In Memoriam Shostakovich. Michael Kugel (viola), Vesna Podrug (piano), 1998,  
The recorded viola.  Volume IV.  Pearl GEMS 0039, PhonCD R2448 reva v.4, 1998
Mark Kopytman, Beyond all this... The Israel Camerata, Avner Biron (conductor), Michael Kugel (viola), 1999, IMI-CD-1929-03
Glinka, Paganini, Bizet, Waxman. Michael Kugel (viola) Asir Rozenberg (piano), 1999
"The greatest Russian violists" (MELODIA)-2009.

"Michael Kugel - Boris Berezovsky" (MELODIA - 2014)

Audio recordings

Michael Kugel plays Carmen Fantasie (Georges Bizet — Franz Waxman, viola arrangement by Michael Kugel)

Video
Some videos can be found here:

Bibliography
Michael Kugel, History of an era. An interpretation of two works for viola, 2002, 
Masterpieces of the Instrumental Music, unpublished
Musical Essay, 2014, ISMN 979-0-9007107-0-3

References
 Budapest Philharmonic, Hall of fame
 First International Viola Competition in Vienna
 New Consonant Music, Composers
 A & E Vienna Limited, Michael Kugel bio
 University of Cincinnati, Bios
 Orford Arts Centre, Biographies, teachers/interpreters

Notes

External links
 Official web-site of Michael Kugel
 Michael Kugel at New Consonant Music

1946 births
Living people
Russian classical violists
Russian classical viola d'amore players
Russian composers
Russian male composers
Academic staff of the Maastricht Academy of Music
Musicians from Kharkiv